Ilseng Prison is a prison in Ilseng, Innlandet county, Norway.

External links
Official site

Buildings and structures in Innlandet
Prisons in Norway
Year of establishment missing